Sueño salvaje is the second  album by Puerto Rican actor and singer Sergio Blass, It was released in 1996

Track listing
 "Extasis de Pasión"
 "Amiga tu"
 "Sueño"
 "Sin tu amor"
 "Es mi vida"
 "Escapar de mi amada"
 "Solo tu"
 "No te se perder"
 "Fiebre"
 "No me des vuelta a la cara"
 "Dueña de mi amor"
 "Soy tu tentación"
 "Viento"
 "Noche salvaje"
 "Sueño" (English Version) Bonus Track*

1996 albums
Sergio Blass albums